Charles A. Testa (born 1956) is an American taxidermist and owner of Ojai Valley Taxidermy in California. A commercial for Testa's business created by Rhett & Link for the show Rhett & Link: Commercial Kings became a viral video, and the catchphrase "Nope, Chuck Testa!" became an Internet meme.

Life and career
Testa was born and raised in the Ojai Valley. He managed his father's Baskin-Robbins store in Venice Beach, California, before he began preserving wildlife.

Commercial and response
In summer 2011, Testa's future son-in-law posted a commercial for Testa's business on YouTube. The video was originally created by Rhett & Link for the show Rhett & Link: Commercial Kings on IFC. The commercial asserts that Testa's work is so realistic that people will assume the animals are still alive. It depicts people reacting to what they believe are live animals in unusual situations, e.g., "Look at that antelope driving a car!", only to have Testa appear and declare, "Nope, it's just Chuck Testa!" The phrase became popular on websites such as Reddit and Tumblr, spurring mainstream media coverage, including Fox News and CBS. The video was also ranked as the #10 best meme of 2011 by Time magazine's Nick Carbone.

Television appearances 
In 2012, Chuck Testa appeared in two episodes of Rhett & Link's Web series, Good Mythical Morning. His shop, Ojai Valley Taxidermy, was promoted in earlier episodes. He again appeared in 2020 as a tie breaking judge during the Ice Cream Taste Test Tournament.

In 2015, Chuck Testa was featured in Season 1, Episode 1 of CarbonTV's original series, American Elements.

In 2016, Chuck Testa and Ojai Valley Taxidermy were featured in the Web documentary Mounted: Chuck Testa and Friends on CarbonTV.

Music 
Testa was featured in Logan-Hugueny Clark's 2013 "Nuketown the Musical." It is a Call of Duty: Black Ops II musical parody of the 2013 song Blurred Lines by Robin Thicke.

The 2019 song "Whip a Tesla" by Yung Gravy and Bbno$ mentions Testa in the chorus, referencing the "Nope" meme.Told your bitch, "Nope," like I'm fuckin' Chuck TestaTesta makes a cameo in the music video.

References

External links
Mounted: Chuck Testa and Friends
Ojai Valley Taxidermy
Whip a Tesla Music Video

Internet memes
1956 births
Living people
Taxidermists
People from Ojai, California
Businesspeople from California
20th-century American businesspeople
21st-century American businesspeople
Viral videos